CajaSur is a Spanish savings bank, property of Kutxabank. It has offices in Andalusia and Extremadura.

Until 2011, CajaSur was a Spanish savings bank, run by the priests in the Catholic Church, located in Córdoba, Spain. It was seized in May 2010 and defaulted in December 2010.

References

Banks of Spain
Companies of Andalusia
History of Córdoba, Spain
Catholic Church in Spain
Catholic Church and finance